William Cromer (occasionally also spelt Crowmer) (died 1434) was an English Sheriff and Lord Mayor of London and a Member of Parliament for the city.

He was described as the son of John Cromer of Aldenham, Hertfordshire but was probably originally from Cromer, Norfolk. By 1390 he had settled in London, where he became a prosperous merchant.

He was Warden of the Drapers Company by 1394, and again in 1428–29. He was appointed Auditor for London for 1399-1400 and 1409–11 and elected an alderman of Billingsgate Ward by 1403 until after July 1420 and of Candlewick Ward from 1420 until his death. He was elected a Sheriff of London in 1405–06 and Lord Mayor of London for 1413–14 and 1423–24.

During his public life he benefitted from a number of profitable commissions from 1407 onwards, when he was also elected to Parliament as member for the City of London (1407, 1417 and May 1421).

He died in 1434 and was buried in the church of St Martin Orgar, Candlewick Street (now Cannon Street), London to which he bequeathed some of his property. He had married twice; firstly Katherine and secondly Margaret, the daughter of Sir Thomas Squiry (Squerie or Squerryes) of Squerryes Court, Westerham, Kent. They had one son William, who inherited his Kentish estates and became an oppressive Sheriff of Kent, falling victim, along with his father-in-law James Fiennes, 1st Baron Saye and Sele, to Jack Cade's rebel army in 1450. His daughter Emmeline became the second wife of the 1st Baron Saye and Sele.

References

14th-century births
Year of birth unknown
1434 deaths
People from Cromer
Sheriffs of the City of London
Members of the Parliament of England for the City of London
15th-century lord mayors of London
English MPs 1407
English MPs 1417
English MPs May 1421